The 1977 Scottish Cup Final was played on 7 May 1977 at Hampden Park in Glasgow and was the final of the 92nd Scottish Cup. Celtic and Rangers contested the match, Celtic won the match 1–0 with Andy Lynch scoring a penalty in the 20th minute after Johnstone was judged to have handled the ball on the line.

The match was the first Scottish Cup final to be televised live since the 1955 final. Rain and the televising of the match led to it having the lowest post-war attendance for a final to that date.

This was Jock Stein's 25th trophy as Celtic manager and the last one he won.

Match details

Final

Teams

References

1977
Cup Final
Rangers F.C. matches
Celtic F.C. matches
1970s in Glasgow
May 1977 sports events in the United Kingdom
Old Firm matches